Liu Yu (courtesy name Bo'an; died November 193) was a Chinese military general, politician, and warlord who lived during the Eastern Han dynasty.

Life
Liu Yu's ancestral home was in Tan County (郯縣), Donghai State (東海國), which is around present-day Tancheng County, Shandong. His ancestor was Liu Jiang (劉彊; 25–58 CE), a son and heir apparent of Emperor Guangwu who was deposed in 43 CE and became the Prince of Donghai (東海王). His grandfather Liu Jia (劉嘉) served as Minister of the Household (光祿勳), while his father Liu Shu (劉舒) served as the Administrator (太守) of Danyang Commandery (丹陽郡).

Liu Yu held various appointments in the Han government during the reign of Emperor Ling ( 168–189), including Chancellor of Ganling State (甘陵國相), Minister of the Imperial Clan (宗正), Inspector of You Province (幽州刺史) and Grand Commandant (太尉). During his tenure, he gained a strong reputation for good, incorrupt and benevolent governance. Even the ethnic minority tribes (e.g. Wuhuan, Xianbei) in You Province and foreign kingdoms near the Han Empire's northern borders (e.g. Buyeo, Yemaek) so highly respected him that they did not dare to cause trouble in his jurisdiction. In recognition of his efforts, the Han government enfeoffed him as the Marquis of Xiangben (襄賁侯).

In the 190s, Liu Yu and another warlord Gongsun Zan got into conflict because of opposing views on how to deal with the ethnic minority tribes and foreign kingdoms: Liu Yu adopted a peaceful and pacifist policy towards them, while Gongsun Zan preferred to use armed force to keep them under control. In 193, Liu Yu rallied an army of about 100,000 and prepared to attack Gongsun Zan. He instructed his troops to focus on eliminating Gongsun Zan and keep casualties and damage as low as possible. However, one of his subordinates, Gongsun Ji (公孫紀), betrayed him and told Gongsun Zan about his plan. Due to Liu Yu's approach of minimising casualties and damage, he lost the battle against the more aggressive Gongsun Zan and was forced to retreat to Juyong County (居庸縣). Gongsun Zan attacked Juyong County, conquered it within three days, captured Liu Yu and brought him as a prisoner to Ji County (薊縣; in the vicinity of present-day Tianjin and Beijing).

Around the time, the Han central government had sent an emissary, Duan Xun (段訓), to bestow additional honours upon Liu Yu and grant him authority to oversee affairs in the four provinces in northern China. Gongsun Zan seized the opportunity to coerce Duan Xun into transferring the titles and honours to him instead. After falsely accusing Liu Yu of plotting treason with Yuan Shao, Gongsun Zan forced Duan Xun to order Liu Yu's execution and bring Liu Yu's head back to the imperial capital Chang'an. Along the way, one of Liu Yu's former subordinates seized Liu Yu's head from Duan Xun and had it buried with the proper funeral rites. As Liu Yu was a highly popular and respected figure in You Province, many people mourned his death.

Family
Liu Yu's son, Liu He (劉和), served as a Palace Attendant (侍中). He was captured and held hostage by the warlord Yuan Shu but later escaped to join Yuan Shu's half-brother, the warlord Yuan Shao. With backing from Yuan Shao, he and his father's former subordinates sought revenge against Gongsun Zan.

In Romance of the Three Kingdoms
In the 14th-century historical novel Romance of the Three Kingdoms, when the Yellow Turban Rebellion breaks out in 184, Liu Yu is then serving as the Governor of You Province. His call for volunteers to assist government forces in suppressing the rebellion is the event which leads to Liu Bei, Guan Yu and Zhang Fei taking the Oath of the Peach Garden and forming their first militia to fight the rebels. This account, however, is historically inaccurate, as Liu Yu did not become the Inspector of You Province until 188.

See also
 Lists of people of the Three Kingdoms

References

 Chen, Shou (3rd century). Records of the Three Kingdoms (Sanguozhi).
 Fan, Ye (5th century). Book of the Later Han (Houhanshu).
 Pei, Songzhi (5th century). Annotations to Records of the Three Kingdoms (Sanguozhi zhu).

193 deaths
2nd-century births
2nd-century executions
Executed Han dynasty people

Han dynasty warlords
Han dynasty politicians
People executed by the Han dynasty by decapitation
Political office-holders in Beijing
Political office-holders in Shandong